The Libyan Revolutionary Command Council was the twelve-person governing body that ruled the Libyan Arab Republic from 1969 to 1977. Its chairman was Muammar Gaddafi, who had the most influence.

In 1977, the Libyan Arab Republic was abolished and Socialist People's Libyan Arab Jamahiriya was established. As a part of this, the RCC was officially abolished and replaced by the general secretariat of the General People's Congress.

Membership

The other initial members (1970) were as follows:
Maj. Abdessalam Jallud (Vice-Chairman)
Maj. Beshir al-Saghir Hawady (until 1975)
Maj. Mukthar Abdullah al-Gherwy
Capt. Abdul Moniem al-Taher el-Huny (until 1975)
Capt. Mustafa al-Kharouby
Maj. Khuwaildi al-Hamidi
Maj. Muhammad Nejm
Maj. Awad Ali Hamza (until 1975)
Maj. Abu-Bakr Yunis Jabr
Capt. Umar Muhayshi (until 1975)
Capt. Mohammed Abu Bakr Al-Magariaf (died in a car accident in August 1972)

History
Setting up a new government, the 12 member central committee of the Free Unionist Officers converted themselves into a Revolutionary Command Council (RCC), which governed the newly established Libyan Arab Republic. Below them were formed a council of ministers, headed by Mahmud Suleiman Maghribi, to oversee the implementation of RCC policy.

Captain Gaddafi was promoted to the rank of colonel, and was recognized as both chairman of the RCC as well as the commander-in-chief of the armed forces, becoming the de facto head of state.  From 1970 to 1972, he also served as prime minister.

Although the RCC was theoretically a collegial body that operated through discussion and consensus building, from the start it was dominated by the opinions and decisions of Gaddafi, although some of the others attempted to constrain what they saw as his excesses.

Gaddafi remained the public face of the government, with the identities of the other RCC members only being publicly revealed in the Official Gazette on 10 January 1970.  All of them were young men, from (typically rural) working and middle-class backgrounds, and none had university degrees; in this way they were all distinct from the wealthy, highly educated conservatives who had previously governed the country. The coup completed, the RCC proceeded with their intentions of consolidating the revolutionary government and modernising the country.

Monarchists and members of Idris' Senussi clan were removed from Libya's political world and armed forces; Gaddafi believed that this elite were opposed to the will of the Libyan people and needed to be expunged.  Many figures in the old regime were imprisoned, though none were executed. They maintained the previous administration's ban on political parties, and ruled by decree. Further restrictions were placed on the press, and in May 1970, trade unions were banned.

After Libya was converted into the "(Great) Socialist People's Libyan Arab Jamahiriya" in 1977, the remaining members of the RCC formed the apex of the "revolutionary sector" that oversaw the government. They were not subject to election, since they held office by virtue of having led the 1969 coup—officially described as "the Revolution." As a result, although Gaddafi held no formal governmental post after 1979, he continued to have the most important role in the government of the country until his overthrow and killing in the First Libyan Civil War in 2011.

See also
History of Libya under Muammar Gaddafi
Libyan Arab Jamahiriya

References

Footnotes

Bibliography

Sources
Libya - Constitution (Adopted on: 11 Dec 1969)
Libya - Declaration on the Establishment of the Authority of the People (Adopted on: 2 March 1977)
The Revolutionary Command Council (RCC)

Government of Libya
History of Libya under Muammar Gaddafi
Military dictatorships
Collective heads of state